114P/Wiseman–Skiff is a periodic comet in the Solar System.

It was discovered by Jennifer Wiseman in January 1987 on two photographic plates that had been taken on December 28, 1986, by Brian A. Skiff of Lowell Observatory. Wiseman and Skiff confirmed the comet on January 19, 1987.

Comet 114P/Wiseman–Skiff is believed to have been the parent body of a meteor shower on Mars and the source of the first meteor photographed from Mars on March 7, 2004.

Aphelion is located near the orbit of Jupiter. On February 25, 2043, the comet will pass  from Jupiter.

References

External links 
 114P at Kronk's Cometography

Periodic comets
0114
Comets in 2013
19861228